Citadel of Crime is a 1941 American drama film directed by George Sherman and written by Don Ryan. The film stars Robert Armstrong, Frank Albertson, Linda Hayes, Russell Simpson, Richard "Skeets" Gallagher and William Haade. The film was released on July 24, 1941, by Republic Pictures.

Plot

Cast 
Robert Armstrong as Cal Fullerton
Frank Albertson as Jim Rogers
Linda Hayes as Ellie Jackson
Russell Simpson as Jess Meekins
Richard "Skeets" Gallagher as Chet 
William Haade as Turk
Jay Novello as Vince
Paul Fix as Nick Gerro
Bob McKenzie as Martin Jackson 
Wade Crosby as Rufe
William "Billy" Benedict as Wes Rankins

References

External links 
 

1941 films
1940s English-language films
American drama films
1941 drama films
Republic Pictures films
Films directed by George Sherman
American black-and-white films
1940s American films